Ellison Quitty is the sixth Anglican Bishop of Ysabel, one of the nine dioceses that make up the Anglican Church of Melanesia: he was elected in November 2015

References

Living people
21st-century Anglican bishops in Oceania
Anglican bishops of Ysabel
Year of birth missing (living people)